Tishk TV was a Kurdish satellite TV channel established in 2006 broadcasting from Europe to Iran and Kurdistan. Tishk TV belonged to the Kurdistan Democratic Party of Iran (KDPI) and was a non-profit TV station with programs in Kurdish, Persian, Arabic and Baluchi languages. Tishk TV had reporters in many countries including Iraq where real-time reportings produced on issues related to human rights and democracy promotion in Iran and across the Kurdish regions in Iran, Iraq, Turkey and Syria.

Distribution
Hotbird-4 Frequency: 11585 MHz Polarization: V Symbol Rate: 27500

References

External links
 

Television stations in Kurdistan Region (Iraq)
Kurdish-language television stations
Television channels and stations established in 2006
Television channels and stations disestablished in 2015
2006 establishments in Iraqi Kurdistan
2015 disestablishments in Iraqi Kurdistan
Mass media in Paris
Kurdish culture in France
Kurdish words and phrases